Diamond Jack may refer to:

 Diamond Jack, a Michigan car ferry
 "Diamond Jack", a song by Wishbone Ash from the 1977 album Front Page News
 "Diamond Jack", an episode from the 1982–83 season of Three's Company
 Diamond Jack, a 2017 animated short by Rachel Kim
 Diamond Jack and the Queen of Pain, a 1983 album by Kevin Ayers
 Diamond Jack Duggan, a  henchman of The Joker in Batman comics
 Louis Alterie (1886–1935), American gangster

See also
 Jack Diamond (disambiguation)
 Jack of Diamonds (disambiguation)
 John Diamond (disambiguation)